Czesław Zając (born 20 January 1927) is a Polish former sports shooter. He competed in the 25 metre pistol event at the 1960 Summer Olympics.

References

1927 births
Living people
Polish male sport shooters
Olympic shooters of Poland
Shooters at the 1960 Summer Olympics
People from Krosno County